Sylvie and the Ghost (French: Sylvie et le fantôme)  is a 1946 French comedy film directed by Claude Autant-Lara and starring Odette Joyeux, François Périer and Pierre Larquey.

It was shot at the Saint-Maurice Studios in Paris. The film's sets were designed by the art directors Jacques Krauss and Lucien Carré.

Plot
Sylvie is fascinated by the portrait of long dead Alain de Francigny and she is upset when her father, Baron Eduard, is forced to sell the painting. The Baron hires an actor to appear as Alain's ghost on the eve of Sylvie's 16th birthday, as a joke. Two admirers of Sylvie decide to also appear as ghosts. All this annoys the actual ghost of Alain de Francigny, and he too makes an appearance.

Cast
 Odette Joyeux as Sylvie
 François Périer as Ramure
 Pierre Larquey as Baron Eduard
 Claude Marcy as La comtesse des Vertus
 Jean Desailly as Frederick
 Paul Demange as The Counsellor
 Marguerite Cassan as Marthe
 Raymond Rognoni as Damas
 Gabrielle Fontan as 	Mariette
 Jacques Tati as The Ghost of Alain de Francigny
 Louis Salou as Anicet
 Julien Carette as Hector
 Ana María Cassan as Girl
 Lise Topart as Girl

Production
The special effect of the ghost appearing was achieved by filming through a glass pane and using two identical sets. Through the glass, the primary set would be visible. This was a regular set where all actors appeared, except the ghost (Tati). At the same time the reflection would be visible of the second set, placed at a ninety degree angle to the primary set.  This set was covered entirely in black velvet, and the only actor on this set was Tati (see Pepper's ghost).

References

External links
 
 
 

1946 films
1946 fantasy films
French fantasy films
Films directed by Claude Autant-Lara
Films with screenplays by Jean Aurenche
French black-and-white films
French ghost films
1940s French-language films
1940s French films